Dominique Hernandez (born 1 August 1960) is a retired French high jumper.

He finished eighteenth at the 1984 European Indoor Championships fourteenth at the 1989 European Indoor Championships and won the bronze medal at the 1989 Jeux de la Francophonie. He participated in 2 world university championships (Bucarest 1981, Kobe 1985…)

Hernandez became French champion in 1985 and 1988 and French indoor champion in 1984, 1988 and 1989. His personal best was 2.25 metres, achieved in August 1988 in Tours. Indoors he had 2.27 metres (Indoor French record) achieved in February 1989 in Liévin.

References

1960 births
Living people
French male high jumpers
20th-century French people